Badenes or Bádenes is a surname. Notable people with the surname include: 

Bernardo Ferrándiz Bádenes (1835–1885), Spanish painter
Elisa Badenes, Spanish ballet dancer
Manuel Badenes (1928–2007), Spanish footballer